Comms Declare is a climate advocacy group within the professional areas of advertising, marketing, Public Relations and media in Australia that highlights we have a climate emergency requiring action on a professional level to address the climate crisis.

The organisation was co-founded by former news journalist Belinda Noble and communications professional Cally Jackson in early 2020. 

“Fossil fuels are the new tobacco. Agencies that align their values with companies that are profiting from environmental damage will lose their best staff as well as clients that want a climate-friendly supply chain,” said Comms Declare co-founder, Belinda Noble. “The ground has shifted. The creative industries must move away from clients that are contributing to climate breakdown, for the sake of the planet, their reputations and bottom line,” 

As at late 2021 Comms Declare is made up of 300 marketing, PR, advertising and media professionals, as well as 80 organisations that have committed to not supporting companies contributing to the growth of fossil fuel emissions in Australia.

Comms Declare founder and communications strategist, Belinda Noble says "We try to find and promote those who put climate front and centre of their communications work."

Publications 

In late November 2021 Comms Declare launched a major report: Fuelling Fantasies: How the ad world is hindering climate action and protecting our biggest polluters, based upon a survey of 200 of Australia’s top agencies in 2020 and 2021.

An earlier report in September 2021 prepared jointly by Comms Declare and Clean Creatives entitled The F-List 2021: 90 Ad and PR Companies Working for the Fossil Fuel Industry highlighted  the 90 advertising, marketing and PR firms that have influenced policy decisions that would have cut greenhouse gas emissions.

Comms Declare contains a list of Comms organisations and individuals committed to  climate action, and also publishes on its website a Polluter Relations list of advertising agencies supporting Major Fossil Fuel clients in Australia.

References

External links
 

Climate change organisations based in Australia
Environmental organizations established in 2020
2020 establishments in Australia